The 2013 College Football All-America Team includes those players of American college football who have been honored by various selector organizations as the best players at their respective positions.  The selector organizations award the "All-America" honor annually following the conclusion of the fall college football season.  The original All-America team was the 1889 College Football All-America Team selected by Caspar Whitney and Walter Camp.  In 1950, the National Collegiate Athletic Bureau, which is the National Collegiate Athletic Association's (NCAA) service bureau, compiled the first list of All-Americans including first-team selections on teams created for a national audience that received national circulation with the intent of recognizing selections made from viewpoints that were nationwide.  Since 1957, College Sports Information Directors of America (CoSIDA) has bestowed Academic All-American recognition on male and female athletes in Divisions I, II, and III of the NCAA as well as National Association of Intercollegiate Athletics athletes, covering all NCAA championship sports.

The 2013 College Football All-America Team is composed of the following College Football All-American first teams chosen by the following selector organizations: Associated Press (AP), Football Writers Association of America (FWAA), American Football Coaches Association (AFCA), Walter Camp Foundation (WCFF), The Sporting News (TSN), Sports Illustrated (SI), USA Today (USAT) ESPN, CBS Sports (CBS), College Football News (CFN), Scout.com, and Yahoo! Sports (Yahoo!).

Currently, the NCAA compiles consensus all-America teams in the sports of Division I-FBS football and Division I men's basketball using a point system computed from All-America teams named by coaches associations or media sources.  The system consists of three points for a first-team honor, two points for second-team honor, and one point for third-team honor.  Honorable mention and fourth team or lower recognitions are not accorded any points.  Football consensus teams are compiled by position and the player accumulating the most points at each position is named first team consensus all-American.  Currently, the NCAA recognizes All-Americans selected by the AP, AFCA, FWAA, TSN, and the WCFF to determine Consensus and Unanimous All-Americans.

In 2013, there were 10 unanimous All-Americans.

Offense

Quarterback
A. J. McCarron, Alabama (AFCA, WCFF)
Jameis Winston, Florida State -- CONSENSUS -- (AP, FWAA, TSN, USAT, CBS, ESPN, SI, Athlon, FOX)

Running back
Ka'Deem Carey, Arizona -- CONSENSUS -- (AFCA, FWAA, WCFF, AP, USAT, CBS, ESPN, SI, Athlon, FOX)
Tre Mason, Auburn  (TSN)
Andre Williams, Boston College -- UNANIMOUS -- (AFCA, FWAA, TSN, WCFF, AP, USAT, CBS, ESPN, SI, Athlon, FOX)

Wide receiver
Kelvin Benjamin, Florida State  (SI)
Brandin Cooks, Oregon State -- CONSENSUS -- (FWAA, TSN, WCFF, AP, CBS, ESPN, SI, Athlon, FOX)
Mike Evans, Texas A&M  -- CONSENSUS -- (AFCA, FWAA, WCFF, AP, USAT, CBS, ESPN, SI, FOX)
Jordan Matthews, Vanderbilt (USAT, Athlon)
Allen Robinson, Penn State  (TSN, CBS)
Sammy Watkins, Clemson (AFCA)

Tight end
Jace Amaro, Texas Tech -- UNANIMOUS -- (AFCA, FWAA, TSN, WCFF, AP, CBS, SI, USAT, Athlon, FOX)
Eric Ebron, North Carolina (ESPN)

Offensive line
Cameron Erving, Florida State  (TSN, SI, USAT)
Hroniss Grasu, Oregon (SI, Athlon)
Gabe Ikard, Oklahoma -- CONSENSUS -- (AFCA, WCFF, CBS, FOX)
Cyrus Kouandjio, Alabama -- CONSENSUS -- (AFCA, FWAA, WCFF, AP, CBS, Athlon)
Taylor Lewan, Michigan  (TSN, FOX)
Jake Matthews, Texas A&M -- UNANIMOUS -- (AFCA, FWAA, TSN, WCFF, AP, USAT, CBS, ESPN, SI, Athlon, FOX)
Jack Mewhort, Ohio State (ESPN)
Cyril Richardson, Baylor -- UNANIMOUS -- (AFCA, FWAA, TSN, WCFF, AP, USAT, CBS, ESPN, SI, Athlon, FOX)
Bryan Stork, Florida State -- CONSENSUS -- (AP, FWAA, ESPN)
Travis Swanson, Arkansas (USAT)
David Yankey, Stanford -- UNANIMOUS -- (AFCA, FWAA, TSN, WCFF, AP, USAT, CBS, ESPN, SI, Athlon, FOX)

Defense

Defensive line
Vic Beasley, Clemson -- CONSENSUS -- (TSN, WCFF, CBS, SI, USAT, Athlon)
Jadeveon Clowney, South Carolina (AFCA)
Aaron Donald, Pittsburgh -- UNANIMOUS -- (AFCA, FWAA, TSN, WCFF, AP, USAT, CBS, ESPN, SI, Athlon, FOX)
Jackson Jeffcoat, Texas -- CONSENSUS -- (AFCA, WCFF, AP, FOX)
Timmy Jernigan, Florida State (ESPN, Athlon)
Kelcy Quarles, South Carolina  (TSN)
Michael Sam, Missouri -- UNANIMOUS -- (AFCA, FWAA, TSN, WCFF, AP, USAT, CBS, ESPN, SI, Athlon, FOX)
Marcus Smith, Louisville (FWAA)
Will Sutton, Arizona State (AP, CBS, USAT, FOX)
Leonard Williams, Southern California (ESPN)

Linebacker
Anthony Barr, UCLA -- CONSENSUS -- (AFCA, TSN, WCFF, AP, CBS, SI, USAT, Athlon, FOX)
Chris Borland, Wisconsin (FWAA)
Khalil Mack, Buffalo (FWAA, CBS, SI)
C. J. Mosley, Alabama -- UNANIMOUS -- (AFCA, FWAA, TSN, WCFF, AP, USAT, CBS, ESPN, Athlon, FOX)
Trent Murphy, Stanford -- CONSENSUS -- (AFCA, FWAA, TSN, WCFF, ESPN, SI, FOX)
Ryan Shazier, Ohio State (AP, USAT, ESPN, SI, Athlon)

Defensive back
Terrence Brooks, Florida State (CBS)
Deone Bucannon, Washington State (AP, Athlon)
Ha Ha Clinton-Dix, Alabama -- CONSENSUS -- (AFCA, FWAA, TSN, ESPN, FOX)
Darqueze Dennard, Michigan State -- UNANIMOUS -- (AFCA, FWAA, TSN, WCFF, AP, USAT, CBS, ESPN, SI, Athlon, FOX)
Ahmad Dixon, Baylor  (AFCA, TSN)
Ifo Ekpre-Olomu, Oregon (ESPN, FOX)
Justin Gilbert, Oklahoma State -- CONSENSUS -- (FWAA, WCFF, CBS)
Anthony Harris, Virginia (SI)
Lamarcus Joyner, Florida State -- UNANIMOUS -- (AFCA, FWAA, TSN, WCFF, AP, USAT, ESPN, SI, Athlon)
Cody Prewitt, Ole Miss (AP, USAT)
Ed Reynolds, Stanford (CBS, Athlon)
Jason Verrett, TCU (WCFF)
Jimmie Ward, Northern Illinois (SI, USAT)

Special teams

Kicker
Roberto Aguayo, Florida State (WCFF, AP, CBS, SI, USAT, Athlon)
Jeff Budzien, Northwestern  (TSN)
Anthony Fera, Texas -- CONSENSUS -- (AFCA, FWAA, WCFF)
Nate Freese, Boston College (ESPN)

Punter
Tom Hornsey, Memphis -- CONSENSUS -- (AFCA, AP, FWAA, USAT, Athlon)
Drew Kaser, Texas A&M  (TSN, SI)
Austin Rehkow, Idaho (WCFF)
Mike Sadler, Michigan State (CBS, ESPN)

All-purpose / return specialist
Antonio Andrews, Western Kentucky (SI)
Odell Beckham Jr., LSU (FWAA, CBS)
Chris Davis, Auburn  (TSN, CBS)
Myles Jack, UCLA (Athlon, FOX)
Jordan Lynch, Northern Illinois (AP)
Ty Montgomery, Stanford -- CONSENSUS -- (AFCA, TSN, WCFF, CBS, SI, USAT, Athlon, FOX)
Ryan Switzer, North Carolina (FWAA, ESPN, Athlon)

See also
 2013 All-Big 12 Conference football team
 2013 All-Big Ten Conference football team
 2013 All-Pac-12 Conference football team
 2013 All-SEC football team

Notes

References
American Football Coaches Association All-America team
Football Writers Association of America All-America team
CBS All-America team. Archived from the original.
ESPN All-America team
Sporting News All-America team
USA Today All-America team
Walter Camp All-America team
Athlon Sports All-America team
Associated Press All-America Team
Sports Illustrated All-America Team. Archived from the original.
NCAA Consensus All-America team
Fox Sports All-America team

All-America Team
College Football All-America Teams